The Northtown Center at Amherst, formerly the Amherst Ice Center and the Amherst Pepsi Center, is a 1,800-seat multipurpose arena in Amherst, New York, located adjacent to the University at Buffalo. The current sponsor is Northtown Auto, a Buffalo area chain of auto dealerships. The ice arena features NHL regulation-sized ice sheets as well as an Olympic-sized ice sheet, which is also capable of hosting sledge hockey.  The main ice arena has a capacity of 1,800 with the other rinks having less capacity. The facility will melt the ice of one rink in the summer to create a roller hockey rink, sports training facility, restaurant, and pro shop.

It is the home to the University at Buffalo Bulls men's ice hockey team competing at the ACHA Division I level in the Eastern Collegiate Hockey League as well as the home of Buffalo Beauts of the Premier Hockey Federation, and the Buffalo Wings, a professional inline hockey team competing in Major League Roller Hockey.

Until the completion of LECOM Harborcenter, the arena was the home of the Buffalo Jr. Sabres of the Ontario Junior A Hockey League and the practice facility for the Buffalo Sabres of the National Hockey League. The arena is also home to several local high school ice hockey teams, and is used by local figure skating clubs, youth, and adult recreational ice hockey leagues, as well as public skating. The U.S. and Canadian sledge hockey teams faced off in a three-game exhibition at the arena in February 2012.

References

External links
Buffalo Wings Inline Hockey

Buffalo Bulls
Buffalo Beauts
Major League Roller Hockey
Indoor arenas in New York (state)
Indoor ice hockey venues in the United States
College ice hockey venues in the United States
Sports venues in Erie County, New York
University at Buffalo
1998 establishments in New York (state)
Sports venues completed in 1998